Marcel Wawrzynkiewicz (born 8 January 1994) is a footballer who plays as a defender for Norwegian club Egersund.

Career 
Wawrzynkiewicz signed for Vålerenga in 2012, having formerly played youth football in Vålerenga and then in Poland. He made his debut for Vålerenga in the First Round of the 2013 Norwegian Football Cup against Frigg. He made his league debut on 27 April 2013 in a 2–1 win over Aalesund in which he won praise for his performance.

In August 2015, Wawrzynkiewicz signed for 2. divisjon club Egersunds IK.

Career statistics

References

External links 
 
 

1994 births
Living people
Norwegian people of Polish descent
Norwegian footballers
Vålerenga Fotball players
Egersunds IK players
Eliteserien players
Norwegian Second Division players
Association football defenders